Saint Peter ad Vincula (Saint Peter in Chains) alludes to the Bible story of the Liberation of Saint Peter, when the Apostle Peter, imprisoned by King Herod Agrippa, was rescued by an angel. Frequently seen translations are:
English – St Peter in Chains
Filipino – , 
French – , 
Italian – , 
Latin –  (gen. )
Latvian – 
Polish – 
Spanish – 

It may refer to:

Festivals and relics
 Liturgical feast of the Liberation of Saint Peter celebrated on 1 August in:
 the pre-1962 General Calendar of the Roman Rite and listed in:
 Tridentine Calendar
 General Roman Calendar as in 1954
 General Roman Calendar of Pope Pius XII.
 as a major double feast day by some traditionalist Catholics
 a third class feast by the Priestly Fraternity of St. Peter (FSSP)
 Veneration of the Precious Chains of the Holy and All-Glorious Apostle Peter on January 16 in the Orthodox Church.
 Relics of the Chains of St. Peter

Church buildings

Belgium
 St. Peter in Chains Church (Beringen)
 , Bertem
 , Dudzele, Bruges
 , Halen
 , Lommel
 Church Saint-Pierre-aux-Liens, a protected heritage site in Ellezelles
 , Oostkamp

Canada
 Église Saint-Pierre-aux-Liens, an historic place in Gloucester County, New Brunswick
 Cathedral of Saint Peter-in-Chains, Peterborough, Ontario

Croatia
 St Peter, Uble, Island of Lastovo

Czech Republic
 Kostel svatého Petra v okovech, Kostelní Hlavno, Prague-East District
 , Krahulov, Třebíč District
 Saint Peter ad Vincula Church, Velenka, Nymburk District

Germany
 , Trebur, Hesse
 , Saarland
 Kirche St. Peter in Ketten, Boppard, Rhineland-Palatinate
 , Bad Kissingen, Lower Franconia
 , Wasserlosen, Bavaria
 , Lower Saxony
 , Lower Saxony
 , Biberach, Upper Swabia
 , Saarland
 St. Peter in Ketten, Montabaur, Rhineland-Palatinate
 , Eichsfeld, Thuringia
 St. Petrus Kirche, Rust, Baden-Württemberg

France
 Saint-Pierre es Liens, Alaigne, Aude, Occitanie
 Saint-Pierre-aux-Liens, Alata, Corse-du-Sud, Corsica
 Église Saint-Pierre-aux-Liens, Allemans, Dordogne
 Saint-Pierre-aux-Liens, Ambly-Fleury, Ardennes, Grand Est
 Saint-Pierre-aux-Liens, Annot, Alpes-de-Haute-Provence, Provence-Alpes-Côte d'Azur
 Parish church of Saint-Victor and Saint-Pierre-ès-Liens, Antignac, Cantal
 Église Saint-Pierre-aux-Liens, Antisanti, Haute-Corse
 Église Saint-Pierre-ès-Liens, Argançon, Aube
 Saint-Pierre-ès-Liens, Arrelles, Aube, Grand Est
 Église Saint-Pierre-aux-Liens, Arzano, Finistère, Brittany
 Saint-Pierre-aux-Liens, Aurignac, Haute-Garonne
 Église Saint-Pierre-ès-Liens, Avon-la-Pèze, Aube
 Saint-Pierre-aux-Liens, Balaives-et-Butz, Ardennes, Grand Est
 Saint Pierre-es-Liens, Balot, Côte-d'Or
 Saint-Pierre-ès-Liens, Bassignac-le-Haut, Corrèze, Nouvelle-Aquitaine
 Église de Saint-Pierre-ès-Liens, Bessan, Hérault  
 Église Saint-Pierre-ès-Liens, Blérancourt, Aisne  
 Église Saint-Pierre-ès-Liens, Boigny-sur-Bionne, Loiret 
 Église Saint-Pierre-ès-Liens, Bourdeilles, Dordogne 
 Saint-Pierre-aux-Liens, Bulle, Gruyère
 Église Saint-Pierre-ès-Liens, Chantérac, Dordogne
 Église St-Pierre-aux-Liens (Chapelle des Carmes-Déchaux), Clermont-Ferrand, Auvergne
 Saint-Pierre-aux-Liens altar, Brasparts Parish close, Châteaulin, Brittany
 Church of Saint-Pierre-ès-Liens, Chédigny, Indre-et-Loire
 Église Saint-Pierre-aux-Liens de Cohennoz, Savoie
 Église St-Pierre-ès-Liens, Colonzelle, Drôme
 Église St-Pierre-aux-Liens, Curbigny, Saône-et-Loire
 Église Saint-Pierre-ès-Liens, Cussac, Haute-Vienne
 Église Saint-Pierre-ès-liens, Dampierre-en-Bresse, Saône-et-Loire
 Église Saint-Pierre-ès-liens, La Douze, Dordogne
 Église Saint-Pierre-ès-Liens, Aubie-et-Espessas, Gironde 
 Église Saint-Pierre-ès-Liens, L'Escarène, Alpes-Maritimes 
 Église Saint-Pierre-aux-Liens, Étais-la-Sauvin, Yonne
 Église Saint-Pierre-ès-Liens, Eyvirat, Dordogne 
 Church of Saint-Pierre-ès-Liens, Fervaches, Manches
 Église Saint-Pierre-aux-Liens, Garat, Charente
 Église Saint-Pierre-aux-Liens, La Giettaz, Savoie
 Église Saint-Pierre-ès-Liens, Dercie, Le Gua, Charente-Maritime
 Église Saint-Pierre-ès-Liens, Jumeauville, Île-de-France 
 Église Saint-Pierre-ès-Liens, Les Riceys, Aube
 Église Saint-Pierre-ès-Liens, Médis, Charente-Maritime 
 Église Saint-Pierre-ès-Liens, Ménestérol, Montpon-Ménestérol, Dordogne
 Saint-Pierre-ès-Liens, Mérifons, Hérault
 Saint-Pierre-aux-Liens, Molliens-Dreuil, Somme, Hauts-de-France
 Église Saint-Pierre-ès-Lien, Mondonville, Haute-Garonne
 Église Saint-Pierre-ès-Liens, Moyemont, Voges 
 Église Saint-Pierre-ès-Liens, Négrondes, Dordogne 
 Église Saint-Pierre-ès-Liens, (replaced by Notre-Dame-de-Sanilhac), Notre-Dame-de-Sanilhac, Dordogne 
 Église Saint-Pierre-ès-Liens, Noailhac, Limousin
 Église Saint-Pierre-aux-Liens, Orgerus, Yvelines
 Church of Saint Pierre-ès-Liens of Doumillac, Pujols, Lot-et-Garonne
 Church of Saint-Pierre-ès-Liens, Rampoux, Lot
 Église Saint-Pierre-aux-liens, Ruoms, Ardéche
 Église Saint-Pierre-ès-liens, Saint-Pierre-de-Chignac, Dordogne
 Église Saint-Pierre-ès-Liens, Saint-Pierre-de-Côle, Dordogne
 Saint-Pierre-ès-Liens Church, Sorigny, Indre-et-Loire
 Église Saint-Pierre-ès-Liens, Thaims, Charente-Maritime
 Église Saint-Pierre-ès-Liens, Vieux-Mareuil, Dordogne

Italy
 Basilica of San Pietro in Vincoli in Rome, the origin of the dedication
 San Pietro in Vincoli, Bienno, Val Camonica, Lombardy (deconsecrated)
 San Pietro in Vinculis, Castellino del Biferno, Molise
San Pietro in Vincoli, Ittiri, Province of Sassari
 San Pietro in Vincoli, Lanzo Torinese Turin, Piedmont
 San Pietro in Vincoli, Madignano, Lombardy
 San Pietro in Vincoli, Moncalvo, Asti, Piedmont
 San Pietro in Vinculis, Naples
 San Pietro in Vinculis (Pisa)
 San Pietro in Vincoli, Salerno
 San Pietro in Vincoli, Spinone al Lago, Bergamo
 San Pietro in Vincoli, Tavernette, Cumiana, Piedmont

Netherlands
 , Bergeijk
 , Diemen
 , Gilze
 , Hilvarenbeek
 , Heer, Maastricht
 , Heesch
 , Leende
 , Macharen
 , Oirschot
 , Oisterwijk
 , Son
 , Venray

Poland

Spain
 San Pedro ad Víncula, Alfoz de Lloredo, Cantabria
 San Pedro ad Víncula, Escañuela, Jaén
 Church of St Peter ad Vincula, Madrid, Vallecas, Madrid

Switzerland 
 Eglise Saint-Pierre-aux-Liens, a cultural property of regional significance in Geneva, Switzerland

United Kingdom

England
 St Peter ad Vincula, Bottesford, Lincolnshire
 Church of St Peter ad Vincula, Broad Hinton, Wiltshire
 St Peter ad Vincula, Coggeshall, Essex
 Church of St Peter ad Vincula, Colemore, Hampshire
 Church of St Peter ad Vincula, Combe Martin, Combe Martin, Devon
 St Peter ad Vincula, Coveney, Cambridgeshire
 Church of St Nicholas and St Peter ad Vincula, Curdworth, Warwickshire
 St Peter ad Vincula, Ditton, Kent
 Our Lady of Doncaster or St Peter-in-Chains, Doncaster, South Yorkshire
 St Peter ad Vincula, Folkington, East Sussex
 St Peter ad Vincula, Hampton Lucy, Warwickshire
 St Peter in Chains Roman Catholic Church, Stroud Green, London
 Church of St Peter ad Vincula, the Chapel Royal in the Tower of London
 St Peter ad Vincula, South Newington, Oxfordshire
 St Peter ad Vincula, Ratley, Warwickshire
 St Peter ad Vincula, Royden, Essex
 Our Lady of the Angels and St Peter in Chains Church, Stoke-on-Trent, Staffordshire
 St Peter ad Vincula, Stoke Minster
 Church of St Peter ad Vincula, Thornaby-on-Tees, North Yorkshire
 St Peter's Church, Threekingham, Lincolnshire; dedicated to St Peter ad Vincula
 St Peter ad Vincula, Tibberton, Worcestershire
 St Peter ad Vincula, Tollard Royal, Wiltshire
 St Peter ad Vincula, Wisborough Green, West Sussex

Ireland
 St. Peter in Chains, Ballymacoda, County Cork

Scotland
 St Peter ad Vincula, Ardrossan, North Ayrshire

Wales
 St Peter ad Vincula, Pennal, the chapel of Owain Glyndŵr

United States
 Cathedral Basilica of Saint Peter in Chains (Cincinnati), Ohio
St. Peter in Chains Hamilton, Ohio

Other uses
 Deusdedit of San Pietro in Vincoli (died 1097–1100), cardinal-priest of San Pietro in Vincoli
 St. Peter In Chains School, Hamilton, Ohio, United States
 Ville Saint-Pierre, a neighborhood of Montreal, Canada, that was originally named Saint-Pierre-aux-Liens
 Cimitero di San Pietro in Vincoli, a cemetery in Turin, Italy

See also
 St. Peter's (disambiguation)
 St. Peter's Church (disambiguation)

Saint Peter
Lists of churches